Wirelesspt  is a non-commercial open grassroots initiative to support free computer networks that is not dependent of central infrastructure, corporation or entity which is done by the ordinary citizen provide free, open and democratic access to the highways of information technologies helping people and organizations implementing wireless networks that will benefit their communities.

The project also invests in investigating free, open source, digital, information and telecommunication technologies as well as to promote, educate and supply technological information to teach and educate its surrounding social environment about the importance of online privacy and security.

WirelessPT is also part of an international movement for wireless community networks in Europe. The Project counts with local communities and was started in the community of Moitas Venda in Portugal.

Goals 
The main goal of WirelessPT is to build a large scale free wireless Wi-Fi network that is decentralized and owned by those who run it and to support local communication. The project is governed by its own agreement which was inspired in the Pico peering Agreement where participants agree upon a network that is free from discrimination and upholds net neutrality. Among other communities like guifi.net and freifunk, WirelessPT has and shares similarities.

Among several goals the project includes:
 Development of mesh networks for communities built by the ordinary citizen
 Foster free access to communication technologies
 Establish wireless connectivity with other communities and regions
 Sharing and developing technological communication resources with and for their communities
 Promote, educate and provide technical information on wireless networks to communities environment about the importance of online privacy, security and democracy.

Technology 
Like many other free community-driven networks, Wirelesspt uses mesh technology to bring up ad hoc networks by interconnecting multiple Wireless LANs using mobile ad hoc network technology and a special routing software. 

If one of these routers fail, this special software automatically calculates a new path to the final destination. This software is called mvwrt firmware. It is based on OpenWrt and other free software such as LEDE and was specifically designed for the needs and challenges of the project.

There are many different developed versions of the firmware depending on the hardware and protocols that local communities decide to use. Having previously tested olsr, WirelessPT decided to work with Ad Hoc and the B.A.T.M.A.N. routing protocol as the firmware base routing protocol.

History 
Founded in January 2011 in Portugal after 2 years of planning the project was first started by its founder with a setup of 9 nodes and 5 gateways in 3 weeks to cover an area of 6 square kilometres using ddwrt firmware.

In 2013 the project developed its own firmware and expanded their nodes count as well as coverage until today and became a registered national trademark in 2016 after participating in the Battlemesh v9 event.

The project is currently active and stable also because it very easy to install the wireless kit specifically created for non-tech-savvy users and with the use of the self-managed and auto configured firmware on off-the-shelf wireless routers a node is fully functional without human interaction soon as the firmware is uploaded to a node.

During its development of the project, it also created one of the best sources of dyi wireless documentation that can be found online offering solutions for small to large projects.

External links 
 Official website also available on the Tor hidden service network]
 Video clip on youtube that explains the project
 Firmware Information (Translation bar provided on the wiki)
 Portuguese mesh network
 Wireless presentation at University of Minho
 Presentation Wireless Battle Mesh v9 2016 at INESC TEC
 Supporter on making regulation work community networks
 Pico Peering Agreement
 Wireless Networking in the developing world. A practical guide to planning and building low-cost telecommunications infrastructure, 3rd edition, Feb. 2013

Custom firmware
Wireless
Wireless networking
Community networks